There Is Only One Love (German: Es gibt nur eine Liebe) is a 1933 German musical comedy film directed by Johannes Meyer and starring Louis Graveure, Heinz Rühmann, Ralph Arthur Roberts and Jenny Jugo. An operetta film, it was released in America in 1936. It was shot at the Babelsberg Studios in Berlin. The film's sets were designed by the art director Erich Czerwonski.

Synopsis
Sir Henry Godwin, a celebrated Kammersänger, and his Ballet master Eddy decide to take a holiday in the Balkan Mountains. They encounter Dolores, a shorthand typist in the area on work, who falls in love Sir Henry while under the mistaken impression that he and Eddy are criminals on the run from the police.

Cast
 Louis Graveure as Kammersänger Sir Henry Godwin
 Heinz Rühmann as Ballettmeister Eddy Blattner
 Ralph Arthur Roberts as Julius Wellenreiter
 Jenny Jugo as Dolores Müller
 Eva Eras as Lilly Montero
 Otto Stoeckel as 	Oberregisseur
 Martha Ziegler as 	Lina
 Bruno Ziener as 	Kapellmeister
 Margot Köchlin as 	Sängerin in der Oper
 Friedrich Ettel as 	Gefangenenwärter
 Willy Kaufman as Manager 
 Ernst Rotmund as 	Schaffner
 Fred Immler as 	Polizeikommissar

References

Bibliography 
 Klaus, Ulrich J. Deutsche Tonfilme: Jahrgang 1933. Klaus-Archiv, 1988.
 Waldman, Harry. Nazi Films in America, 1933-1942. McFarland, 2008.

External links 
 

1933 films
Films of Nazi Germany
1933 musical comedy films
1933 musical films
German musical comedy films
1933 comedy films
1930s German-language films
Films directed by Johannes Meyer
German black-and-white films
Films shot at Babelsberg Studios
Operetta films
Fox Film films
1930s German films